The Danish Union of Joiners (SF) was a trade union representing joiners and cabinetmakers in Denmark.

The union was founded in 1885, and was an early member of the Danish Confederation of Trade Unions (LO).  By 1969, it had 16,057 members.  The following year, it merged with the Danish Carpenters' Union, to form the Danish Union of Joiners and Carpenters.

References

Carpenters' trade unions
Trade unions in Denmark
Trade unions established in 1885
Trade unions disestablished in 1970